Red Chittagong, also known as RCC, Kamdhino, Madaripuris a breed of cattle native to Bangladesh. Locally, the breed is known as Lal Birish.

The breed has mainly originated in the Chittagong District of southern Bangladesh. Red Chittagong is similar in most ways to the native or local cattle, except that its coats as well as tongue, eyebrow, eyeball, eyelash, horns, hooves, vulva and tail switch are also red. A RCC bull weighs about 250-400 kilograms, while its cow counterparts are roughly 150-250 kilograms.

See also 

 List of breeds of cattle

References 

Cattle breeds
Cattle breeds originating in Bangladesh